Lois Waisbrooker (21 February 1826 – 3 October 1909) was an American feminist author, editor, publisher, and campaigner of the later nineteenth and the early twentieth centuries. She wrote extensively on issues of sex, marriage, birth control, and women's rights, plus related areas of radical thought like free speech, anarchism and spiritualism. She is perhaps best remembered for her 1893 novel A Sex Revolution.

Biography
Born Adeline Eliza Nichols in upstate New York, she grew up in poverty there and in Ohio. She had little formal education, and worked for some years as a domestic servant. Beginning at the age of seventeen, an illegitimate pregnancy, a forced marriage, a quick widowhood and a brief second marriage inspired her devotion to feminist values. She converted to spiritualism and became a "trance speaker" at spiritualist gatherings. By 1863 she had adopted the name Lois Waisbrooker, and began a practice of lecturing and journalism that continued through the remainder of her life. "She wrote passable poetry, but didactic prose was her forte." She helped to organize the Boston Social Freedom Convention in the 1870s, and served as an official of the American Labor Reform League in 1882–83.

Waisbrooker founded and edited three periodicals, Our Age, Foundation Principles, and Clothed with the Sun (sometimes even setting the type and operating the printing press). In 1892 she "served as acting editor of an anarchist free-thought weekly titled Lucifer, the Light-Bearer" when its former editor Moses Harmon went to prison. Like other radical writers of the period, she was prosecuted under the Comstock Act that prohibited the sending of obscene materials through the U.S. mail. She was involved in public controversy, and was the subject of condemnation and ridicule, throughout her career. In August 1894, the Topeka State Journal ran a story about her under the derisive headline "A Queer Old Woman Thinks She Has a Mission to Perform."

Waisbrooker spent a late phase of her career at the experimental community of Home, Washington. She arrived there early in 1901; local residents built her a small house. While there, Waisbrooker became involved in another legal controversy. She and the local postmistress, Mattie D. Penhallow, were arrested and charged with disseminating obscene material — the material in question being an article in Clothed with the Sun titled "The Awful Fate of Fallen Women." A jury convicted Waisbrooker; a sympathetic judge sentenced her to the minimum penalty, a fine of $100. (Penhallow was acquitted, though the U.S. Post Office subsequently closed the Home post office.)

Waisbrooker continued her activities to the end of her life, despite advancing age and worsening health. She left Home for Denver in 1904, and died in Antioch, California where she is buried along with son, Abner Fuller in Oak View Memorial Park," at the age of eighty-three. "Penniless at the time of her death in 1909, Lois Waisbrooker had spent over forty years promoting the twin ideas of assertive womanhood and female sexuality as a positive power."

Selected works

 Mayweed Blossoms (1871), novel
 The Sexual Question and the Money Power (1873)
 Nothing Like It, or Steps to the Kingdom (1875), novel
 From Generation to Regeneration (1879)
 Helen Harlow's Vow (1884), novel
 Perfect Motherhood; or Mabel Raymond's Resolve (1890), novel
 The Fountain of Life; or The Threefold Power of Sex (1893)
 The Occult Forces of Sex (1893)
 A Sex Revolution (1893), novel
 The Wherefore Investigating Company (1894), novel
 Anything More, My Lord? (1895)
 The Temperance Folly; or Who's the Worst? (1900)
 My Century Plant (1903)
 Women's Sense of Power (1903)
 Eugenics; or Race Culture Lessons (1907)

References

Bibliography

1826 births
1909 deaths
19th-century American novelists
19th-century American women writers
20th-century American women writers
20th-century American writers
American anarchists
American feminists
American suffragists
American spiritualists
American women novelists
American women's rights activists
Anarcha-feminists
Free love advocates
People convicted under the Comstock laws